Cheryl R. Riley (born 1952) is an American artist and furniture designer. Her official website is cherylrriley.com/

Career

Furniture 

Riley pursued a career in advertising and fashion before focusing on design. In 1986, Riley formed Right Angle Designs in San Francisco, starting out by designing and producing furniture. She is said to be one of the only African American designers to establish a national reputation for her furniture design.

Her furniture work is exhibited and permanently displayed in museums throughout the United States, including Coin Encrusted Tudor Tables II & III (1992) at the Cooper Hewitt National Design Museum, Sunburst and Starburst Chairs (1994) and de Medici Cabinets (1994) at the Oakland Museum of California, Zulu Renaissance Writing Table for a Lady (1995) and Hunter’s Screen (1994-1998) at the San Francisco Museum of Modern Art, and Bakuba Griffin Dining Table (1992) at The Mint Museum in Charlotte, NC. The Zulu Renaissance Table (1995-1996) will be exhibiting at the Montreal Museum of Fine Arts from the Francisco Museum of Modern Arts’ permanent collection. The exhibition is called “Parall(elles) A History of Women in Design”  and curated by Jennifer Laurent, Curator of Decorative Arts and Design Musée des beaux-arts de Montréal​. Organized in collaboration with the Stewart Program for Modern Design, this major exhibition celebrates the instrumental role women have played in the world of design through a rich corpus of art works and objects dating from the mid-19th century onwards. In addition, it examines the reasons why women are underrepresented in the history of this discipline and encourages an expanded understanding of what constitutes design.
Riley's furniture work has been featured in over 60 group shows throughout the United States and several solo shows in New York and California, including the Smithsonian's Cooper-Hewitt Design Museum in 1993.

Other Work 
The cities of San Francisco, New York, Atlanta, and Sacramento have commissioned Riley for murals and sculptures since the inception of Right Angle Designs. She designed the interior of the public lobby of Bayview Police Station in Bayview-Hunters Point, San Francisco, from 1991 to 1997. In 2000, Riley was hired to design the mural, MBUTI WOMEN (2000) in San Francisco, CA Bayview District.

Riley was commissioned to design the awards statue for the American Black Film Festival (then called the Acapulco Black Film Festival Awards). In 2019, the award was acquired by the Smithsonian's National Museum of African American History and Culture for their permanent collection.

Her "GLYPH" series is a visual vocabulary system painted on vintage encyclopedia pages. In 2019, her 300 glyphs were on display in the group show “Woven” at The Arts Center of Greenwood in South Carolina.

Riley's TRANSCENDENCE PRESERVED (2017-2018) sculpture series was featured in shows such as "Amulets Ethereal" at the Barney Savage Gallery in New York.

As an advocate for artists of the Black African Diaspora, Riley has long utilized different portals to educate and illuminate. One venue has been writing about artists for publications geared, primarily, to the African American audience. She's penned profiles of Lyle Ashton Harris, Kara Walker, and Gary Simmons for Ebony. Riley has also written about the Studio Museum in Harlem for Essence, a series of columns for Uptown about art's rising stars, and a profile of Mickalene Thomas for aRUDE. In addition to writing an exploration of African American art in Jersey City, NJ, Riley also appeared on the cover of the Winter 2019 issue of Jersey City Magazine alongside her piece, "150 Bay Street: A Creative haven honors the Promise of the Powerhouse Arts District."

The patterns on Riley's African Textile Glass Panels hark back to our ancestors in Africa, the mother continent for all humans. The layers are both horizontal and three-dimensional, the stacked design is achieved by carving into the front and back of the glass and applying a variety of tissue thin metal lead sheets to the back.

References 

1952 births
Living people
20th-century American artists
20th-century American women artists
21st-century American artists
21st-century American women artists
African-American women artists
American furniture designers
20th-century African-American women
20th-century African-American artists
21st-century African-American women
21st-century African-American artists